Chatuchak Station is a railway station in Chatuchak District, Bangkok. It serves the SRT Dark Red Line.

History 
Chatuchak station was built above the existing Nikhom Rotfai KM.11 ground-level railway halt on the State Railway of Thailand's Northern and Northeastern Main Line which primarily served commuter trains. Chatuchak station was initially named KM.11 station to match the halt, but was later changed. The station opened on 2 August 2021 following the opening of the SRT Dark Red Line. The Nikhom Rotfai KM.11 Halt was closed on 19 January 2023 after all services started operating on the elevated tracks.

References 

Railway stations in Bangkok
Railway stations in Thailand
Chatuchak district